Near South Side or Near Southside can refer to:

Near South Side, Chicago
Near Southside, St. Louis
Near Southside, Fort Worth

See also
Near East Side (disambiguation)
Near North Side (disambiguation)
Near West Side (disambiguation)